The American Italian Anti-Defamation League was a political advocacy group formed by a group of Italian Americans from New York City in 1967. It held a concert in New York City at which Frank Sinatra, the national chairman, sang for an audience of 20,000. The group's ostensible purpose was to prevent Italian Americans as a group from being defamed, primarily by being uniformly stereotyped as all being involved with or related to persons or activities associated with the Mafia.

The American Italian Anti-Defamation League were sued by the original Anti-Defamation League, a Jewish organization founded to discredit the blood libel, the Protocols of the Elders of Zion and other instances of anti-Semitism. The suit was based on the purported appropriation of the ADL's name in a way which would likely cause confusion between the two groups by members of the general public. The Italian group relinquished the name and eventually dissolved.

The American Italian Anti-Defamation League promoted a national campaign against the book The Valachi Papers on the grounds that it would reinforce negative ethnic stereotypes. If the book's publication was not stopped they would appeal directly to the White House. Attorney General Nicholas Katzenbach reversed his decision to publish the book after a meeting with President Lyndon B. Johnson; an action that embarrassed the Justice Department.

In May 1966, Katzenbach asked a district court to stop Maas from publishing the book—the first time that a U.S. attorney general had ever tried to ban a book. Maas was never permitted to publish his edition of Valachi's original memoirs, but he was allowed to publish a third-person account based upon interviews he himself had conducted with Valachi. These formed the basis of The Valachi Papers, which was published in 1968.

See also
Italian-American Civil Rights League

References

Political advocacy groups in the United States
Organizations established in 1967
Italian-American organizations